The Koeltztown Tunnel is a railway tunnel in Osage County, Missouri. It was built in 1903 by the Chicago, Rock Island and Pacific railroad. The tunnel is part of the former Kansas City to St. Louis, Missouri line, and is tunnel two of four. The line was once owned by the Missouri Central Railroad, but now is owned by the utility giant Ameren.

External links
 http://bridgehunter.com/mo/osage/koeltztown-tunnel/

Buildings and structures in Osage County, Missouri
Railway tunnels in Missouri
Tunnels completed in 1903